Ebou is a Gambian male given name. Notable people with the name include:

 Ebou Adams (born 1996), Gambian footballer
 Ebou Dibba (1943–2000), Gambian novelist and teacher
 Ebou Kanteh (born 1995), Gambian footballer
 Ebrima Ebou Sillah (born 1980), Gambian footballer

African given names